Alfred Klahr (16 September 1904 – 1944) was an Austrian communist politician, journalist and historian. He was a leading Marxist intellectual and theorist in the First Austrian Republic.

Biography 
Alfred Klahr was born on 16 September 1904 in Vienna. His father Salman Klahr worked as hazzan in Israelitische Kultusgemeinde Wien. Becoming a student at the University of Vienna, Alfred Klahr joined the Kommunistischen Jugendverband. 
From 1930 Klahr lived in Moscow and worked as representative of the Communist Youth Union of Austria. From 1935 to 1937 he taught in Austrian section of International Lenin School. In 1937 Klahr turned to Prague and worked in communist newspaper Weg und Ziel. From 1938 - after Anschluss and annexation of Czechoslovakia - Alfred Klahr was active in anti-nazi Austrian Resistance. From August 1942 he was detained in Auschwitz concentration camp (as Ludwig Lokmanis,
prisoner number 58933). He was member of Kampfgruppe Auschwitz. 15 June 1944 Alfred Klahr (together with polish communist, PPR member, Stefan Bratkowski) managed to escape, but he died afterward, shot by the SS in nazi-occupied Warsaw.

Klahr's theory of the national question in Austria  
In March and April 1937 Klahr published the series of articles titled  Zur nationalen Frage in Österreich. In these texts he explain how the Austria emerged from the German part of Europe to take another political direction.

This permitted to understand the conflict between the clerical Austrofascism and the Pan-German Nazism, each being expression of different social classes.

In Auschwitz Klahr wrote the famous Auschwitz text, as a result of debates by Austrian and German communist detained in Auschwitz.

See also 
 Communist Party of Austria
 Marxism and the National Question
 German Question
 German nationalism in Austria
 Austrofascism

References 

Bibliography
 Literature about Alfred Klahr

External links 
 Alfred Klahr Gesellschaft
 Article about Alfred Klahr and the national question

Austrian Jews
Austrian communists
Communist Party of Austria politicians
Jewish socialists
Austrian Marxists
Austrian historians
Marxist historians
Marxist theorists
Escapees from Auschwitz
1904 births
1944 deaths
Austrian expatriates in the Soviet Union
20th-century Austrian journalists
Austrian Jews who died in the Holocaust
Austrian people executed by Nazi Germany
People executed by Nazi Germany by firearm